Mumu may refer to:

 Mumu, a pork dish in Papua New Guinean cuisine, can also refer to the cooking method or the feast at which the dish is eaten
 Muumuu, a loose dress of Hawaiian origin
 Mumu, a nickname of Hindi film actress Mumtaz (actress)
 "Mumu" (short story), a short story by Ivan Turgenev published in 1854
 Mumu (1959 film), a Soviet drama film
 Samuel Archambault
 Mumu (2010 film), a French film
 Mumu (computer worm) (or Muma),  isolated in 2003
 Mumu (or momo), a ghost or monster in Philippine mythology
 The UK band The KLF were previously known as The Justified Ancients of Mu Mu
 Moo-Moo, a chain of buffet restaurants in Moscow, Russia
 Mumu or Muma is the Old Irish for the province of Munster

See also
 Mu (disambiguation)
 Mum (disambiguation)